Negative pressure may refer to:

 Negative value of a pressure variable
 Negative room pressure, a ventilation technique used to avoid contaminating outside areas
 Negative pressure ventilator, also known as an iron lung
 Negative-pressure wound therapy